Donji Lipovac may refer to:

 Donji Lipovac, Croatia, a village near Nova Kapela
 Donji Lipovac, Serbia, a village near Brus

See also 
 Lipovac (disambiguation)